is a Japanese motorcycle racer. He races a factory Yamaha YZF-R1 in the JSB1000 class of the All Japan Road Race Championship. He has won the Suzuka 8 Hours four times (2015, 2016, 2017, 2018) and the JSB1000 championship title ten times (2008, 2009, 2012, 2013, 2014, 2015, 2016, 2018, 2019, 2021).

Career
A former competitor in the MFJ All Japan Road Race GP250 Championship between 1999 and 2005, Nakasuga moved into the All Japan Superbike Championship, winning the title in 2008, 2009, 2012, 2013, 2014, 2015 and 2016 for Yamaha. After losing the title to Honda's Takumi Takahashi in 2017, he added an eighth and ninth title to his resume in 2018 and 2019.

Nakasuga had his premier class Grand Prix start at the Valencia circuit at the final race of the 2011 season as a replacement for the injured Jorge Lorenzo, finishing a creditable sixth place. In 2012, he made a wild-card appearance for Yamaha at his home race at Motegi, finishing ninth, before making another appearance for the factory team at Valencia, this time in place of the injured Ben Spies. Taking advantage of a wet circuit and numerous retirements ahead of him, Nakasuga was able to finish a distant second behind race winner Dani Pedrosa, becoming the only Japanese rider to score a podium finish in any class during 2012.

He won the Suzuka 8 Hours in 2015 with Pol Espargaró and Bradley Smith, in 2016 with Espargaró and Alex Lowes and in 2017 and 2018 with Lowes and Michael van der Mark.

Alongside his racing duties, he currently is the lead test rider for Yamaha in MotoGP.

Career statistics

Grand Prix motorcycle racing

By season

Races by year
(key) (Races in bold indicate pole position, races in italics indicate fastest lap)

Suzuka 8 Hours results

References

External links

 

1981 births
Sportspeople from Fukuoka Prefecture
Japanese motorcycle racers
Living people
250cc World Championship riders
Yamaha Motor Racing MotoGP riders
MotoGP World Championship riders